Insights West was a full service Canadian market research and polling company. It was established in 2012 by Steve Mossop to provide services to private and public sector clients across Western Canada.

Insights West's headquarters were located in Vancouver, British Columbia, Canada, and the company also had an office in Calgary. The company specialized in public opinion polls and consumer research. It also ran Your Insights, an online panel created to conduct surveys with representative samples of residents of British Columbia and Alberta, and the Your Insights Multicultural Panel, focusing on the opinions and perspectives of the Chinese and South Asian populations in Metro Vancouver.

In October 2015, Insights West announced the acquisition of focus group facility SmartPoint Research, located in the Yaletown area of Vancouver, which was renamed "Vancouver Insights Centre".

From June 2013 to April 2018, Insights West's electoral forecasting program issued 23 correct predictions of democratic processes in Canada and the United States, including the only forecast of the 2015 Metro Vancouver transportation and transit plebiscite issued within the guidelines set by Elections BC, the 2015 Alberta provincial election, the 2016 United States presidential election and the 2017 British Columbia provincial election.

In May 2018, Angus Reid, chairman of the non-profit Angus Reid Institute, announced the acquisition of the "Your Insights" Panel, and rebranded it as the Angus Reid Forum.

In November 2021, Léger acquired Insights West for an undisclosed sum.

External links
 Electoral record
 Profile of Steve Mossop
 Your Insights Online Panel
 Launch of Insights West, 2012
 Your Insights Multicultural Panel
 Vancouver Insights Centre
 Why Does Alexa Ranking Matter?
 Sale of Your Insights panel to Angus Reid
 Acquisition of Insights West by Léger
 "Understanding the Manitoba Election 2016" by Andrew Taylor  -->

Companies based in Vancouver
Market research companies of Canada
Public opinion research companies